Steven Charles Pope (born 15 November 1972) is a former South African cricketer. Pope was a right-handed batsman who bowled leg break and occasionally played as a wicketkeeper. Pope was born at East London, Cape Province.

In a career that lasted 14 seasons, he represented Eastern Cape, Border, Border B, Warriors, Huntingdonshire, Cornwall, Eastern Province and Eastern Province B.

Something of a journeyman within South Africa, Pope did play 9 List-A matches for Cornwall, where his family originate, and one for Huntingdonshire in English county cricket. In his 14-year career, he forged a successful, if inconsistent first-class career. He played 93 first-class matches, where he scored 5,958 runs at a batting average of 32.91, with 27 half centuries and 12 centuries. His highest score in first-class cricket was 156*. With the ball he took 48 wickets at a bowling average of 31.27, with 2 five wicket hauls and best figures of 7/62. In List-A cricket, he played a total of 106 matches, where he scored 2,660 runs at an average of 31.29. In the process, he made 21 half centuries, but no centuries, with a high score of 98*. He also took 29 wickets in List-A cricket, at a bowling average of 22.55 apiece, with best figures of 4/38.

Toward the end of his career, Twenty20 cricket was introduced, with Pope playing 6 matches each in the format for Eastern Cape and later Warriors. In his 12 matches he scored 116 runs at an average of 12.88, with a high score of 34.

Family
His father Charles Pope played first-class and List-A cricket for Border. His uncle Ken McEwan also played first-class and List-A cricket.

References

External links
Steven Pope at Cricinfo
Steven Pope at CricketArchive

1972 births
Living people
Cricketers from East London, Eastern Cape
South African cricketers
South African people of Cornish descent
Eastern Province cricketers
Border cricketers
Warriors cricketers
Huntingdonshire cricketers
Cornwall cricketers
Wicket-keepers